Edgardo Maerina (born 31 March 1964) is a Filipino rower. He competed in the men's single sculls event at the 1988 Summer Olympics. He later served as head coach of the Philippine national rowing team as part of the Philippine Rowing Association.

References

1964 births
Living people
Filipino male rowers
Olympic rowers of the Philippines
Rowers at the 1988 Summer Olympics
Place of birth missing (living people)
Rowers at the 1994 Asian Games
Asian Games competitors for the Philippines